Onicha-Ugbo is a town in Aniocha North Local Government Area, Delta State, Nigeria. The town's traditional ruler is the Obi of Onicha-Ugbo; as of 2002, the obi is Agbogidi Chukwumalieze.

Religion 
Christianity is the primary religion of the Onicha-Ugbo Community.

Notable people from Onicha-Ugbo

Dr Emmanuel Ibe Kachikwu, current Group Managing Director (GMD) of the Nigerian National Petroleum Corporation(NNPC) and immediate past Vice-Chairman and General Counsel for ExxonMobil in Africa.
Jude Monye, Olympic athlete who competed in Atlanta 1996 and won a silver medal at Sydney 2000.
 Ikenwa Ashibuogwu Nnabuogor, Renowned sports journalist and writer and one of Nigeria's foremost sports journalists. Studied at IMT Enugu and Babcock University and reputed to have contributed immensely to the sports journalism industry in Nigeria and Africa. Currently writing for www.scorenigeria.com.ng having worked for the country's top journals like KICKOFF Nigeria, FourFourTwo Nigeria and Complete Football soccer magazines.
 Chukwuemeka Ebube Odeigah[Prince], currently attending IUPUI in Indiana. Hopes to go to med school.
Charles Chinye Ikejiunor Okobah[Prince], scholar and academician, renowned Lawyer (served at the Delta state Judiciary), author of several books (on legal practice, fiction, public administration and management, and Marriage).

References

External links
 Onicha-Ugbo through the centuries, Chudi Okwechime Max-Henrie & Associates, 1994

Populated places in Delta State